A Video-Enhanced Grave Marker (VEGM) is a Western-style tombstone equipped with weatherproofed video playback that can be initiated by remote control.

The VEGM, invented by Robert Barrows of San Mateo, California, would allow its owner to record messages to be played to any visitor to the site with a remote control. The stones would be equipped with weatherproofed video playback and recording devices plus computer storage and a monitor placed within a weather-proofed, hollowed-out headstone. , Barrows  estimated that the costs of the VEGMs might start at about  USD$8000 to $10,000.

 was issued on The Video Enhanced Gravemarker on August 8, 2006.  Barrows commented soon after its invention: "I envision being able to walk through a cemetery using a remote control, clicking on graves and what all the people buried there have to say. They can say all the things they didn't have the opportunity or guts to say when they were alive."

To prevent noise pollution, the audio can also be transmitted to wireless headsets, made available by the cemetery's office.

References

Burial monuments and structures